Jacques-Martin Hotteterre (29 September 167316 July 1763), also known as Jacques Martin or Jacques Hotteterre, was a French composer and flautist who was the most celebrated of a family of wind instrument makers and wind performers.

Biography
Hotteterre was born in Paris, France, the son of Martin Hotteterre (d. 1712) and Marie Crespy. In about 1704, Jacques-Martin Hotteterre succeeded his cousin Jacques in the post of basse de hautbois et taille de violon at the royal court.

Hotteterre lived and studied in Rome early in his career, and his nickname le Romain (the Roman) came from this period. He spent two years (1698–1700) employed by Prince Francesco Ruspoli in Rome, before adopting the nickname of "Le Romain" at some point between 1705 and 1707.  By 1708, he became a musician to the King of France, in the king's 'Grande Écurie, and in 1717, he inherited René Pignon Descoteaux's post as Jouëur de Fluste de la musique de chambre.

Hotteterre owed his fame largely to his talent for playing the flute, an instrument for which he wrote a number of pieces, significantly extending the repertory for the instrument. In addition, he played the bassoon, oboe, and musette. Hotteterre was also an internationally celebrated teacher to aristocratic patrons. He wrote one method for the transverse flute, recorder, and oboe, published in 1707, as well as a method for the musette, published in 1737.  His L'Art de préluder sur la flûte traversière was published in 1719. It was Europe's first flute manual and was used widely.

Several transverse flutes marked HOTTETERRE with the device of an anchor, discovered within the last hundred years or more, have provided actual specimens of the alleged result of the Hotteterres' efforts.  Specialists in woodwind history are generally aware of three "Hotteterre" flutes—in Berlin, St. Petersburg and Graz—all of which closely resemble the one in Picart's engraving. However it has recently been shown that two of these are nineteenth-century replicas of a specimen now lost, and only the Graz example is in fact the work of Jacques Hotteterre or his father, Martin.

In addition to performance and teaching, Hotteterre continued his family's tradition of wind instrument making. It may have been Hotteterre who made a number of changes in the design of the transverse flute, though there is little concrete evidence for this. Most notably, the flute, which had previously been made in one cylindrical piece, was cut in three pieces: the head (with the mouthpiece), the body (with most of the holes), and the foot (with one, keyed hole for the low E).

Numerous other members of the Hotteterre family were reputed to have been fine woodwind players; some also had a decisive impact on woodwind instrument construction. Jacques's grandfather Jean (c. 1605 to 1690–1692) was noted for his playing and innovative building. He may have been influential in certain developments in woodwind instruments, and he is credited with creating the oboe. Jean and his son Martin (c. 1640–1712), father of Jacques-Martin, were responsible for important advances in musette making. A number of recorders by the Hotteterre family also survive, none of which are believed to be by Jacques-Martin.

Jacques-Martin Hotteterre died in Paris in 1763.

Compositions
Op. 1 Principes de la flûte traversière, ou flûte d'Allemangne, de la flûte à bec ou flûte douce et du hautbois, divisez par traictez (1707)
Op. 2 Premier livre de pièces pour la flûte traversière et autres instruments avec la basse (1708)
Op. 3 Sonates en trio pour les flûtes traversières et a bec, violon, hautbois (1712)
Op. 4 Première suitte de pièces suite de pièces à deux dessus, sans basse continue. Pour les flûtes-traversières, flûtes à bec, violes, " (1712)
Op. 5 Deuxième livre de pièces pour la flûte traversière et autres instruments avec la basse (1715)
Op. 6 Deuxième suite de pièces à deux dessus pour les flûtes-traversières, flûtes à bec, violes, etc... avec une basse adjoutée et sans altération des dessus, laquelle on y pourra joindre pour le concert" (1717)
Op. 7 L'art de Préluder (1719)
Op. 8 Troisième suite de pièces à deux dessus (1722)
Op. 9 Concert de Rossignol (lost)
Op. 10 Méthode pour la Musette contenant des principes, par un recueil d'airs et quelques préludes (1738)
Airs et brunettes à deux et trois dessus avec la basse – Tirez des meilleurs autheurs (1721)
Arrangements of pieces by Valentine and Torelli for two flutes
Arrangement of trios by Albinoni (lost)

Media

References

Bibliography
Giannini, Tula. 1993a. "Jacques Hotteterre le Romain and his Father Martin: A Re-examination Based on Recently Found Documents".  Early Music XXI, no. 3 (August): 377–395.  [Includes genealogical chart, illustrations, transcriptions and translations of documents.]
Giannini, Tula. 1993b. Great Flute Makers of France, the Lot and Godfroy Families (1650–1900). London: Tony Bingham. 
Sardelli, Federico Maria. 2007. Vivaldi's Music for Flute and Recorder, translated by Michael Talbot. Aldershot, England; Burlington, VT: Ashgate, in association with the Istituto Italiano Antonio Vivaldi/Fondazione "Giorgio Cini".

External links

1673 births
1763 deaths
Musicians from Paris
18th-century classical composers
18th-century French composers
18th-century French male musicians
Flute makers
French Baroque composers
French classical bassoonists
French male classical composers
French classical flautists
17th-century male musicians